John Samuel Smith (1841 – 6 July 1882) was an Australian politician.

He was the son of solicitor John Smith and was a wealthy squatter at South Creek. He married actress Kate Corcoran. He owned racehorses, including Speculation which won the Sydney Cup in 1874 and in partnership with William Long, the unbeaten Grand Flaneur.

In 1872 he was elected to the New South Wales Legislative Assembly for Wellington, serving until 1877 when he unsuccessfully contested Nepean.

Smith died in London in 1882 aged 41.

References

 

1841 births
1882 deaths
Members of the New South Wales Legislative Assembly
19th-century Australian politicians